Al-Shorta Sports Club is a Syrian professional football club based in Damascus.

Achievements
Syrian League: 2
1980, 2012

Syrian Cup: 4
1966, 1968, 1980, 1981

Performance in AFC competitions
 AFC Cup: 2 appearances
2012: Quarter-finals
2013: Quarter-finals

Current squad

Former notable players

  Alexandre Torrezan
  Diniz
  Edmar Figueira
  Fabio Marinho
  Geílson
  Leonardo
  Maxwell
  Vitor Sonny
  Amer Al Abtah
  Dorel Stoica
 Ibrahim Alshayah
  Hamdi Al Masri
  Ahmad Al Salih
  Maher Al Sayed
  Mosab Balhous
  Fadi Beko
  Mohamad Daas
  Ahmad Deeb
  Ali Diab
  Taha Dyab
  Ali Ghalioum
  Qusay Habib
  Oday Jafal
  Mahmoud Karkar
  Zaher Midani
  Ahmad Omaier
  Raja Rafe
  Anas Sari

External links
  Official forum website - shurttawi.riadah
 Al-Shorta logo

Football clubs in Syria
Sport in Damascus
Association football clubs established in 1947
1947 establishments in Syria